Salman Aslam Butt is a Lahore based lawyer & advisor, who was born & grew up in Lahore. He was appointed as the 31st Attorney General for Pakistan in 2014 and representedthe  Nawaz Sharif Government. He also presented Nawaz Sharif in the Panama case.

Early life and education
He was born in Lahore and completed his education also in Lahore.  After graduation, he was admitted in the University Law College and earned a Law Degree of LL.B. before moving to London to complete his LL.M. from the University of London. He joined the legal profession in 1982. He is senior Partner of M/s Cornelius, Lane & Mufti (CLM) the oldest Law Firm in Pakistan.

Attorney General for Pakistan
Salman was appointed as the 31st Attorney General for Pakistan after the election of 2013 and remained there till 2016 when he resigned. He appeared in the Supreme Court of Pakistan to represent Prime Minister Nawaz Sharif in the famous Panama case in which at subsequent stages of the case and after his resignation, Nawaz Sharif was declared disqualified from the office of Prime Minister by the Supreme Court of Pakistan.

Area of practice
He and his Law Firm CLM deals in documentation, consultation, legislation, aviation, energy, tax and litigation of constitution, commercial, corporate, banking, Insurance, civil, criminal, family, rent matters, and all legal matters.

See also
 Supreme Court Bar Association of Pakistan
 Lahore High Court Bar Association 
 Attorney General for Pakistan

References

Living people
Lawyers from Lahore
Year of birth missing (living people)
People from Lahore